Carl Edward Washington (born December 18, 1978) is an American actor, writer, and producer.

Early life
He was born in Los Angeles, California in the Hollywood area. He attended and graduated Westchester High School in June 1997. He started extra work at 16 appearing in such films as Mars Attacks, Jingle All the Way and the zombie film Hood of the Living Dead.

Filmography

As Writer
Chat Room (2002)
As Producer
Urban Massacre (2002)
Latin Kingz (2003)
Sweet Potato Pie (2004)
J.C. in tha Hood (2006)
Unemployed (2007)
As Actor
Killjoy (2000)
The Chatroom (2002)
Dead Season (2002)
The Crawling Brain (2002)
Voodoo Tailz (2002)
Creepies (2003)
Midnight is Coming (2003)
Jack Movez (2003)
Hot Parts (2003)
Latin Kingz (2003)
Drug Lordz (2003)
Dope Game 2 (2003)
Tha' Crib (2004)
Wild Things 2 (2004)
Sweet Potato Pie (2004)
East L.A. King (2004)
I Got Five on It (2005)
Rampart (2005)
Hood of the Living Dead (2005)
Slaughter Party (2005)
Evil Ever After (2006)
J.C. in the Hood (2006)
Illegal Business (2006)
Broken Glass (2006)
Aces (2006)

References

External links

African-American male actors
American male film actors
American film producers
American male screenwriters
1978 births
Living people
21st-century American politicians
21st-century American businesspeople
21st-century African-American politicians
20th-century African-American people